The Basilica of the Assumption of Our Lady in Old Brno Abbey is a high Gothic, monumental convent temple. It was founded in 980-1020 by the unknown lord or monarch in Moravia. It was built on the site of an ancient sanctuary from the late 10th century in a short time in the years 1323 to 1334 at the instigation of Queen Elizabeth Richeza. It is the best preserved stylistically coherent and unified temple in Lands of Bohemian crown.

History 
The temple is rightly called a gem of gothic architecture of Lands of Bohemian crown. In 1323 the double queen - royal widow Elizabeth Richeza founded a Cistercian convent (in Latin) called Aulae Sanctae Mariae beside to the oldest pre romanesque parisch church of Oure Lady in Old Brno. After her death in 1335 Elizabeth Richeza found her final resting burial place in the basilica. The spot is marked by the letter „E“ with a small crown carved in the paving of the church.

In the 18th century, the interior of the church was rebuilt in the baroque style. That period also witnessed the finishing of the Baroque buildings of the Abbey. In the 1783 the Austrian Emperor Joseph II closter abbey Old Brno was dissolved (Josephinists reforms) and ordered the Augustinians to move to Old Brno from their original monastery of St. Thomas was situated in front of Běhounská Gate (Porta Rhenensis), later Lažansky square (what is now Moravské náměstí).

The Augustinians also had a glorious "silver altar" in baldachin form made in Augsburg and erected when the icon of the Black Madonna was crowned in 1736.
At the Feast of the Assumption of Our Lady a pilgrimage is held every year on August 15 in the basilica to worhip her as the Protector of the city of Brno.

The abbey church was promoted in 1987 by John Paul II to the rank of a Minor Basilica

Architecture 
The abbey church is of typical Cistercian architecture, built in the Gothic style - cruciform layout - main nave, transept and two side aisles. The nave and its flanking aisles have a vaulted by rib vault. The nave and its transept a vaulted ceiling more than 22 m (72,6 ft) high. The triple choir consists of the right choir in the east and two side chapels in cruciform layout. The crossing is separated from the nave by a massive transverse arches. Whole building body have 34 monumental tracery windows, most of them tripled. Nine of them with lancet arch, 14 equilateral arch. The church was primarily constructed as fair faced brick work (Flemish bond), the first brick Gothic building in the region but using also stone (for arches, quoins, dripstones, embrasures, dripstones, water tables, plinths gargoyles) from the local area - Stránská skála quarry – crinoid limestone. The building has an inside length of 67,45 metres (38 moravian fathoms), width 28,4 metres (16 moravian fathoms) and a height to the ceiling of 23.07 metres. Transept 40 m. Building as typical Cistercian churches have no tower, only one small flèche (spire) - on the crossing of central nave and transept. The layout of the basilica consists of one nave and two aisles, with the transept crossing the nave and aisles. South side of the transept have now an entrance.

Notable individuals 
 Elizabeth Richeza  - Queen
 John of Bohemia - King and cofounder
 Henry of Lipá  - Governor and Magnate, cofounder
 Gregor Mendel    - Abbot and scientist
 Leoš Janáček    - Composer
 František Klácel - Priest
 Francis Thomas Bratranek - Priest and Cracow University Rector
 Pavel Křížkovský - Composer and friar

Gallery

Services 
Regular religious services in the Basilic are:

Sunday	   07:30 Mass, 09:00 Mass,  11:00 Mass 
Tuesday 18:00 Mass
Wednesday 18:00 Mass
Thursday 18:00 Mass
Friday	   18:00 Mass
Saturday 08:00 Mass

See also 
 Czech Gothic architecture
 St Thomas's Abbey, Brno
 Porta coeli Convent
 Cistercian architecture

Further reading 
 KUTAL, Albert, (1972) Gothic art in Bohemia and Moravia.London/New York, Hamlyn ISBN
 BOEHM, Barbara Drake; et al. (2005). Prague: The Crown of Bohemia, 1347-1437. New York: The Metropolitan Museum of Art. 
 HLOBIL, Ivo (eds. 2000), The Last Flowers of the Middle Ages. From the Gothic to the Renaissance in Moravia and Silesia. Olomouc/Brno.  
 SAMEK, Bohumil (1993), Klášter augustiniánů v Brně. Brno NPU. 62 P. (in Czech)

Transport

References

External links 
 Abbey home page

Basilica churches in the Czech Republic
Churches in Brno
Cistercian Order
Gothic architecture in the Czech Republic
Cistercian monasteries in the Czech Republic
14th-century Roman Catholic church buildings in the Czech Republic
National Cultural Monuments of the Czech Republic
1320s establishments in Europe
1323 in Europe